Slade Alive! is the first live album by the British rock band Slade. The album was released on 24 March 1972 and reached No. 2 on the UK Albums Chart, remaining in the chart for 58 weeks. It was Slade's first album to enter the UK charts and also the first to enter the Billboard 200 in the United States, where it reached No. 158. The album was produced by Chas Chandler.

Slade Alive! contains three original songs, plus cover versions of songs by Ten Years After, The Lovin' Spoonful, Bobby Marchan, and Steppenwolf. It was recorded live at Command Theatre Studio and mixed at Olympic Studios.

Today, the album has been considered one of the greatest live albums of all time. Kiss, who were heavily influenced by Slade, would title their 1975 live album Alive! as a homage to Slade Alive!.

Background
Having made their UK breakthrough with the hits "Get Down and Get With It", "Coz I Luv You" and "Look Wot You Dun", Slade decided that the best way to break into the album charts would be to capture their live sound on record. In October 1971, the band played three consecutive nights at London's Command Theatre Studio in front of a audience. The three nights cost £600 to record.

Initially Chandler rejected Command Studio's mix of the album, which was completed in conjunction with the band. He remixed the tapes himself, but the band rejected that version and went back to their own original mix. Prior to the album's release, "Hear Me Calling" was released as a promotional single in February 1972, with "Get Down With It" as the B-Side. The release was limited to 500 copies.

Issued in March 1972, Slade Alive! reached number two in the UK. In Australia, it reached No. 1 and was the biggest-selling album since The Beatles' Sgt. Pepper's Lonely Hearts Club Band (1967).

Release
In its original LP vinyl format, the album was issued in a gatefold sleeve which revealed a huge cartoon drawing on the inside. This drawing was the winning entry in a competition run in The Sun newspaper to design the album cover. In Israel and Italy, the front cover used the inner gatefold artwork instead, whilst certain editions releases in the Netherlands and France also used this design.

In 1978, the album was given a German release as a double-pack LP with a gatefold sleeve, paired with the Slade Alive, Vol. 2. It received its first CD release in 1991, which was digitally remastered by Lea. In 2006, it was included as part of the Salvo two-disc live compilation Slade Alive! – The Live Anthology. Salvo re-issued it on vinyl in 2009 and on CD in 2011. In 2017, BMG released a deluxe edition to celebrate its 45th anniversary. It was issued on vinyl with a 6-page insert and art card, and on CD with a 28-page booklet. In December 2021, BMG reissued the album on splatter vinyl.

Promotion
As a major part of promotion for the album, the band did a UK tour in May.

On the UK Granada Television, the band performed a 'Set of Six' show on 13 June 1972. This filmed set featured a similar set to Slade Alive!, the tracks in order being "Hear Me Calling", "Look Wot You Dun", "Darling Be Home Soon", "Coz I Luv You", "Get Down and Get With It" and "Born To Be Wild".

Song information
"Hear Me Calling", a cover of the 1969 song by Ten Years After, was originally planned as Slade's follow-up single to their 1971 breakthrough hit "Get Down and Get With It". However, the band couldn't better the song in the studio and the idea was dropped. In 2011, the vinyl acetate containing the studio version appeared as a bonus track on the 2011 Salvo remaster of Sladest. In a 1981 interview, drummer Don Powell said of "In Like a Shot from My Gun": "It was originally meant to be put down in the studio. But after we recorded it for Slade Alive!, we didn't think that we could do it any more justice by doing it in the studio - as it's basically a live number."

"Darling Be Home Soon", a cover of the 1967 song by The Lovin' Spoonful, notably features Holder burping into the microphone. In 2000, he admitted on The Frank Skinner Show that the burp was accidental as the band had a lot to drink before performing. Holder also stated that from then on, he had to continue to do the burp whenever the song was performed otherwise the audience would be disappointed. "Know Who You Are" is an original song which originally appeared on the band's 1970 album Play It Loud. "Get Down With It" is a cover of the 1965 Bobby Marchan song. Aside from being Slade's breakthrough hit, it was regularly featured as part of the band's live set for the band's entire live career. "Born to be Wild", a cover of the 1968 song by Steppenwolf, was originally recorded in the studio by Slade for their 1969 debut Beginnings.

Critical reception

Upon release, Record Mirror felt the "rocking album" was a "good quality live recording". They added: "The excitement of the group and crowd has been captured well". New Musical Express said: "Slade Alive! is just what it implies. If you've ever been to one of their noisy gigs, you'll know exactly what I mean." The album would later be rated No. 2 in the magazine's Top 10 albums of 1972. Melody Maker commented: "Because it was recorded in a studio proper, before an audience, they've achieved the kind of balance and sound not often heard on a live recording."

Gregor Vaule of Colorado Springs Gazette-Telegraph felt the album "crammed" much of the band's "famous in-person excitement", adding: "The LP thunders in on Alvin Lee's "Hear Me Calling" and from that point on there is never a dull moment." Mike Diana of Daily Press Newport News described the album as a "real toe tapper", adding: "The boys play a frenetic kind of rock 'n' roll that features screaming lyrics, monosimple rhythms and buzzing guitars." Robert Hilburn of the Los Angeles Times commented on the band's "forceful, celebrative nature" and concluded: "As with any band worth its rock 'n' roll shoes, Slade Alive sounds better the louder you play it." Rich Aregood of the Philadelphia Daily News described the album as "eminently enjoyable", noting: "...Slade is something else again. A loud, rude, and exciting flatout rock-and-roll band that could even get Pat Nixon tapping her toe."

In 1991, Q described the album as "distinctly heavy" with a "laddish rock style". They concluded: "It's just fun and beers all the way." In 2010, Classic Rock considered the album "superior: reputation cementing". AllMusic commented: "Slade showed why they were one of England's best live acts with this fevered concert recording. Set alight by plenty of stomping beats, lumbering bass, fat guitars, and Noddy Holder's hoarse vocal scream, Slade Alive! finds the lads from Wolverhampton goading on their rabid fans at every juncture."

Track listing

Chart performance

Personnel
Slade
Noddy Holder - lead vocals, rhythm guitar
Dave Hill - lead guitar, backing vocals
Jim Lea - bass, backing vocals
Don Powell - drums

Additional personnel
Chas Chandler - producer
Barry Ainsworth - recording engineer
Alan O'Duffy - mixing engineer
Derek Robinson - artwork
Chris Walter - photography (front)
M. Webb - artwork (sleeve inner)

References

1972 live albums
Slade live albums
Polydor Records live albums
Albums produced by Chas Chandler